Derek Dorsett (born December 20, 1986) is a Canadian former professional ice hockey right winger who played for the Columbus Blue Jackets, New York Rangers and Vancouver Canucks of the National Hockey League (NHL). The Blue Jackets drafted him in 2006 in the seventh round, 189th overall. After nine years in the NHL, Dorsett retired after repeated injuries to his neck. He is currently the assistant to the head coach of the Upper Arlington ice hockey team. Dorsett was best known for his role similar to that of an enforcer.

Playing career

Junior
Dorsett played major junior ice hockey with the Medicine Hat Tigers of the Western Hockey League (WHL) and helped them win the Ed Chynoweth Cup as WHL champions in 2006–07. Dorsett established himself as a gritty player with Medicine Hat, leading the team in penalty minutes in 2006–07 while finishing tied for second in team scoring with 64 points.

Professional

Columbus Blue Jackets
Dorsett was drafted by the Columbus Blue Jackets 189th overall in the 2006 NHL Entry Draft. Graduating from major junior, he spent 2007–08 with the Syracuse Crunch, the Blue Jackets' American Hockey League (AHL) affiliate. He scored his first NHL goal the following season on October 21, 2008, against Roberto Luongo in a 4–2 win against the Vancouver Canucks.

New York Rangers
During the lockout-shortened 2012–13 season, Dorsett was included in a trade deadline deal, along with Derick Brassard, John Moore and a sixth-round pick, to the New York Rangers in exchange for Marián Gáborík and minor league players Blake Parlett and Steven Delisle on April 3, 2013.

Vancouver Canucks
On June 27, 2014, Dorsett was traded by the Rangers to the Vancouver Canucks in exchange for a third-round pick in the 2014 NHL Entry Draft. Upon joining the Canucks, he switched his jersey number to 51, as his usual 15 was being worn by teammate Brad Richardson. In the 2015 season, he posted career highs in both assists and points, and scored seven goals; his most since 2012 (including three game-winning goals). On April 8, 2015, the Canucks signed Dorsett to a four-year $10.6 million contract extension. Following Richardson's departure from the team in the offseason, Dorsett changed his jersey number back to 15 for the 2015–16 season, where he led the league in penalty minutes with 177.

Injury and retirement
On December 5, 2016, the Canucks announced that Dorsett had herniated a cervical disc in his neck. The injury required surgery, sidelining him indefinitely. He had managed one goal and three assists in 14 games up to that point in the 2016–17 season.

On November 30, 2017, Dorsett announced his retirement from the NHL. This was simultaneously announced alongside news that he had again herniated a cervical disc in his neck, a separate injury from his previous one. He decided to end his career after learning this information, citing health reasons and risks associated with playing.

Playing only 20 games in the 2017–18 season, Dorsett managed to record seven goals and two assists, as well as 74 penalty minutes.

Personal life
Dorsett and his wife, Allison, have three children together (two sons and one daughter). They also have a doodle.

Career statistics
Bold indicates led league

Awards and honours

References

External links

1986 births
Living people
Canadian ice hockey right wingers
Columbus Blue Jackets draft picks
Columbus Blue Jackets players
EC Red Bull Salzburg players
Ice hockey people from Saskatchewan
Medicine Hat Tigers players
New York Rangers players
Sportspeople from Kindersley
Syracuse Crunch players
Vancouver Canucks players
Canadian expatriate ice hockey players in Austria